Thomasclarkite-(Y) is a rare mineral which was known as UK-93 until 1997, when it was renamed in honour of Thomas H. Clark (1893–1996), McGill University professor. The mineral is one of many rare-earth element minerals from Mont Saint-Hilaire. The only reported occurrence is in an alkalic pegmatite dike in an intrusive gabbro-nepheline syenite.

See also
List of minerals
List of minerals named after people

References

Mont Saint-Hilaire

Carbonate minerals
Lanthanide minerals
Yttrium minerals
Sodium minerals
Monoclinic minerals
Minerals in space group 3